Ian John Kerr (born 10 February 1935) is a New Zealand retired field hockey player. He competed at the 1960 and 1964 Summer Olympics and finished fifth in 1960.

References

External links
 

1935 births
Living people
Olympic field hockey players of New Zealand
Field hockey players at the 1960 Summer Olympics
Field hockey players at the 1964 Summer Olympics
Sportspeople from Wellington City